Bai Meng Yan ( born 23 September 1994), known by her stage name Bai Lu, is a Chinese actress and model who predominantly works in Chinese television drama industry. Bai Lu started her acting career in 2016 and has since then starred in a lot of popular dramas. She is best known for her roles in The Legends, Love Is Sweet, One and Only, and Forever and Ever.

Early life 
Bai Lu was born Bai Meng Yan on 23 September 1994 in Changzhou, Jiangsu.

In 2010, she enrolled into the Foreign Language major under the Changzhou Technical Institute of Tourism and Commerce. She is fond of reading and has an elegant writing style. With her teacher's encouragement, she participated in the Jiangsu Provincial Essay Writing Competition and was placed first. In addition, she also debuted as a screenwriter for a school drama on psychosocial themes and a classroom culture themed drama which were well received.

In 2012, Bai Lu participated in SM Entertainment's overseas audition, but was unsuccessful. After graduating her major in 2015, she then began working as a graphic model for Taobao. She shot a film for Literary Style magazine and for the first time appeared on the magazine cover of its April edition. In the same year, Bai Lu began to pursue her career as an actress and acted in a short film《遇见你这么美好的事情》- Meeting You Is Such A Good Thing produced by Cat's Tree Studio. She also subsequently acted as the protagonist in a few more short films under the same production all of which gained online popularity.

In July 2016, Bai Lu featured in Rover Lu's MV, "Liu Yan" - Message as the protagonist.

Career

2016 – 2018: Beginnings
In 2016, Bai signed a contract with Yu Zheng's entertainment company Huanyu Film. She then acted in her first television series Zhaoge, playing a noble lady.

In 2017, Bai starred in the historical comedy television series King Is Not Easy, which is her first leading role. The same year, she was cast in the fantasy drama The Monkey King: Land of Beauty as the female lead.

In 2018, Bai starred in historical romance drama Untouchable Lovers, playing dual roles in the series, as a female general (Hou Xuan) and a prince's concubine (Le Yun). She was awarded the Newcomer Award at the iQiyi All-Star Carnival for her performance.

2019 – Present: Rising popularity
In 2019, Bai starred in the xianxia drama The Legends alongside Xu Kai, where her role as an overbearing demoness received positive reviews. The same year, she starred in the youth military drama Arsenal Military Academy and romance comedy drama Lucky's First Love. 
She was also cast in the historical romance drama Jiu Liu Overlord alongside Lai Yi.
 
In 2020, Bai starred in the workplace romance drama Love Is Sweet alongside Luo Yunxi, playing an idealistic but intelligent financial analyst.

In 2021, Bai starred in One and Only and Forever and Ever.

Filmography

Television series

Short film

Variety show

Music Video

Discography

Singles

Music video

As lead artist

Awards and nominations

References

External links 

1994 births
Living people
21st-century Chinese actresses
Actresses from Changzhou
Chinese television actresses